Ilagan, officially the City of Ilagan, is a 1st class component city and capital of the province of Isabela, Philippines. According to the 2020 census, it has a population of 158,218 people making it the most populous city in the province. It holds the title as the most number of voters in the province with 98,565 electorates. Ilagan was a first class municipality before it became a city.

The city is located on the central portion of the province of Isabela. It is bounded by nine municipalities: on the north by the municipalities of Divilacan, Tumauini, and Delfin Albano; on the west by the municipality of Quirino; on the east by the municipalities of Divilacan and Palanan, and the Pacific Ocean; and on the south by the municipalities of Gamu, Naguilian, Benito Soliven and San Mariano.

Etymology
From an inversion of the Ibanag word nagali which means move or transfer in the English language, due to the relocation of the site of the capital from Naguilian Baculod to its present site in barangay San Vicente. The move was due to economy and security of the town. Another etymology, according to Fr. Julian Malumbres, Ilagan derived its name from the word laga, an Ibanag word for smallpox during the town's founding in 1686 where the disease was widespread.

History

Early history
The town was then called by its native Gaddang settlers as Bolo during the pre-Spanish conquest era. It is one of the populous settlement during that period and site of the vast tobacco plantation in the region making it one of the most important economic areas in northern Luzon.

Spanish colonial era
Shortly after Juan de Salcedo conquered Northern Luzon in 1587, Gov. Rodrigo de Penalosa sent Capt. Pablo de Carreon to explore Cagayan Valley as well as to establish missions in towns. Among the Spanish missionaries who penetrated deeply into the region was P. Pedro Jimenez, who founded Ilagan.

The town of Bolo was founded by the Dominicans in 1619 in honor of Saint Ferdinand of Castile. The old Bolo was situated in the western side of Cagayan River in what is known today as barangay Naguilian-Baculod. The cultural shock brought by the dominating social and economic regulations introduced by the Spanish authorities propelled the natives to dissent in the Mallig and Ilagan-Tumauini territories in what was known as the Gaddang Revolution. The natives abandoned their settlement after burning their church and houses until 1622 when the Spanish government pardoned and exempted them from paying tribute within three years. After the Gaddang revolt, the natives re-established their settlement upon the efforts of Fr. Pedro Jimenez in 1678 on the east side of the river thereby giving the legendary name for Ilagan which is the reverse of the word nagali meaning move or transfer. The Dominicans accepted the settlement as an ecclesiastical mission given the name San Fernando de Ilagan in honor of its patron, Saint Ferdinand of Castile.

On May 4, 1686, Ilagan was founded and missionaries converted the natives to Christianity. Ilagan was made the capital town of Cagayan Valley when Brig. Manuel Sanchez Mira was then the governor of the whole territory.

In 1763, Ilagan was the scene of revolt led by Dabo and Juan Marayag against the collection of tribute, the enforcement of tobacco monopoly committed by the friars during the Spanish colonization.

On May 1, 1856, Ilagan became the capital town when Isabela de Luzon was founded.

American invasion era
The present day Ilagan is an area that was detached from the old province of Nueva Vizcaya. The first municipal president of the town, Rafael Maramag, added luster to the history of his hometown by becoming the first governor of the province of Isabela after its reorganization by the Americans in 1901.

On August 4, 1901, the American occupation under the United States-Philippine Commission has enacted the Provincial Government Act 210 that has re-established Isabela and other provinces in the Philippines. Rafael Maramag, a former municipal president (mayor) of Ilagan was appointed as the first governor. The act then re-established Ilagan as the provincial capital.

On November 13, 1925, Gaffud has approved a resolution filed by all Municipal Presidents of the Isabela (the counterpart of the present-day Mayors' League) following a four-day convention. The resolution called for the erection of a monument in honor of the country's National Hero José Rizal in Ilagan public plaza located in barangay Bagumbayan.

Japanese occupation era
The fortunes of Isabela as a province and Ilagan as a town followed a similar path to the rest of the country's history as a commonwealth nation and as a free republic in 1942, the Japanese occupation, liberation, political and military independence to this day.

On June 19, 1945, Ilagan town was liberated under the Japanese Army as part of the liberation campaign with the combined forces of 14th Infantry, United States Army Forces in the Philippines – Northern Luzon (USAFIP-NL), under the command of Lt Col. Romulo A. Manriquez, and the 37th Division of the U.S. Sixth Army against the Japanese.

During this era, a man-made tunnel was constructed from the sweat and blood of detained Ilagueños and it is now a tourist destination in the city. The tunnels are believed to have served as headquarters of the Japanese soldiers.

Philippine independence
By the turn of the 1950s, the new Poblacion was located uphill from the old Saint Ferdinand Parish Church, formerly known as Saint Ferdinand Cathedral in barangay Bagumbayan to barangay San Vicente, which is the site of the current City Hall.

The Martial Law era

When Ferdinand Marcos' September 1972 declaration of Martial Law began a 14-year period of authoritarian rule, the province of Isabela - including Ilagan - became a center of both conflict and protest when Marcos crony Danding Cojuangco and his associate Antonio Carag managed to block a Spanish-era grant which was supposed to see the return of Hacienda San Antonio and Hacienda Santa Isabel in Ilagan to local farmers. Cojuangco and Carag purchased the two haciendas themselves, displacing tens of thousands of farmers who were supposed to get those lands back a hundred years after the Spanish acquired them.

In its desire to serve its parishioners, the Roman Catholic Diocese of Ilagan hosted a Social Action Center which would help the farmers. In the Social Action Center's newsletter, the "Courier," researcher Sabino Padilla Jr. documented and exposed the ways by which Cojuangco, Carag, the provincial government and the military harassed the farmers who were supposed to get the land. This all led to a protest march in joined by 12,000 protesters from all over Isabela, and eventually, for 4,000 farmers to finally get the titles to their land. But it also earned the ire of the administration.

In 1982, Padilla and 12 others were arrested by the regime and jailed under poor conditions at the Bayombong, Nueva Vizcaya Stockade of the Philippine Constabulary until almost the end of the Marcos regime.

In 1983, soldiers went as far as to raid the residence of the Bishop of Ilagan, Miguel Purugganan, in search of alleged rebels and firearms. They found none, but continued to keep Bishop Puruggananan and the church workers under him under military surveillance.

Cityhood

Ilagan has attempted to gain cityhood status at least three times in its history:

On February 2, 1998, congress passed Republic Act No. 8474 which sought to convert Ilagan into a city. But the plebiscite held on March 14, 1999, turned down its bid for cityhood. The majority of the people voted no in that event.
On March 2, 2005, House bill no. 3847 was filed and approved by the house and transmitted for the cityhood of Ilagan but remains pending for concurrence in the senate. The bill did not go through when mayor Delfinito Albano was gunned down by three unidentified men in the night of June 27, 2006, in Quezon City. The campaign used the term C-U-DAD Ilagan for the cityhood status of Ilagan.
On February 27, 2012, Ilagan renewed its bid for cityhood as sponsored by house bill no. 5917. Local officials of the town expressed support for the town's conversion into a city. On May 22, 2012, the congress approved the cityhood bill of Ilagan on its House Resolution No. 144 and was signed by then President Benigno Aquino III on June 21, 2012. Plebiscite was held on August 11, 2012, with a majority of votes voting yes. By virtue of Republic Act 10169, Ilagan was then proclaimed as a new component city, the third in the province of Isabela and the fourth in Cagayan Valley on the same day by COMELEC Commissioner Armando Velasco.

Contemporary
On August 28, 2019, the city government created the Ilagan Development Authority (ILAGANDA) which is aimed to transform Ilagan into a liveable city in the year 2030.

Geography

Barangays
Ilagan City is politically subdivided into 91 barangays, the most barangays in the province. These barangays are headed by elected officials: Barangay Captain, Barangay Council, whose members are called Barangay Councilors. All are elected every three years. Each barangay consist of 7 puroks and some have sitios.

Currently, there are 13 barangays in the city that are considered urban (highlighted in bold). Barangays are grouped into 4 clusters, namely Centro Poblacion Cluster, Northeastern Cluster, San Antonio Cluster, and Western Cluster. 

As of December 31, 2022, the following barangays are considered urban: Alibagu, Baculud, Bagumbayan, Baligatan, Calamagui 1st, Calamagui 2nd, Centro Poblacion, Guinatan, Imelda Bliss Village, Osmeña, San Vicente, Santa Barbara and Santa Isabel Sur.

Land

Of the total 1,166.26 km2 land area of Ilagan; 31% are agricultural, 36% are forest areas and the remaining 33% are built-up areas and open grassland areas that are available for industrial, commercial and residential uses. Of all cities in the country, Ilagan ranks as the top producer of corn. As an agriculture-based city, it produces ample supply of corn, rice, vegetables and legumes. Fruits like the banana are year-round products especially in the mountainous areas of the city. Ilagan also produces seasonal fruits such as mangoes and pomelo. The Cagayan Valley Research Center (CVRC) is an attached agency of the Department of Agriculture (DA) that serves as the primary plant breeding institution in Cagayan Valley. It is one of the Bureau of Agricultural Research’s active partners in research and development in the region. It is located in barangay San Felipe along National Highway. Ilagan has rich forest resources. Hectares of forest land are strictly protected by authorities like the Department of Environment and Natural Resources (DENR), several NGOs and the Local Government Unit.

Climate
Ilagan has a tropical savanna climate (Köppen Aw) with consistently hot temperatures year-round, a dry season from January to April and a wet season from May to December.

Demographics

Population

The rapid increase of population in Ilagan is attributed to the current growth of economic activities specially in the sectors of Commerce, Industry, Agriculture and Housing. Ilagan is one of the 145 emerging cities in the Philippines with more than 100,000 residents. Statistics from the Philippine Statistics Authority show that Ilagan had a population 131,24311 in 2007, which increased to 135,174 people in the 2010 census making Ilagan as the most populous city in the province of Isabela and the second in Cagayan Valley after Tuguegarao.

Ethnicity
Ilagueños today reflects a combination of indigenous, Chinese and Hispanic descent. The core community was composed of tribes notably the Agta, Ibanag, Gaddang, Yogad, and Kalinga which mirrors the habitation of the Philippines believed to have started 26,000 years ago with various strains of Aetas, then Indonesians coming 5,000 years ago and the Malays in droves starting 200 years B.C. up to 1500 A.D. Trade and cultural relations with Chinese preceded the 16th century incursion of the Spaniards. Ilocanos who already developed their own distinct traits were recorded to have migrated massively in the 19th century owing to the accessibility of the land and vast opportunities in the area straddling from the present day provinces of Cagayan and Nueva Vizcaya. It was proclaimed a province by a Royal Decree and Named Isabela de Luzon on the first day of May in 1856.

Languages
Ilagan is dominated by use of Ibanag and Ilocano languages. Tagalog is also used as verbal communication channel between Ibanag and Ilocano speakers. English is used primarily in communication for government publications, local newsprints, road signs and commercial signs and in doing official business transaction in the city.

Religion
Ilagan's population is predominantly Roman Catholic. The Diocese of Ilagan has 39 catholic churches all over the province of Isabela. Its former seat was in Saint Ferdinand Parish then it is now transferred to Cathedral of Saint Michael the Archangel in Gamu, Isabela.

There are also Protestants, Baptist, Church of Christ, Adventists, Born Again groups, Victory Christian Fellowship, Latter Day Saints, Jehovah's Witnesses, Islam, and Philippine-based groups like Iglesia ni Cristo and Members Church of God International that accounts to the city's population. These religious organizations have their own temples and churches sparsely located in the city.

Economy

Agriculture and fishery remains to be the main backbone of Ilagan's economy. There are almost 23,803 hectares that are basically cultivated land and 314 hectares are utilized for fish culture. However, the suitable farm area of Ilagan is 32,153.19 hectares potentials for crops, livestock and fish production. This figure shows that a significant percentage (24.99%) is not being fully utilized for agricultural production leaving them idle and under utilized.

Commerce and trade is the second economic based income of the people of Ilagan. In the year 2006, statistics showed that there are currently 1,795 registered business establishments. For year 2000, commercial trade was at 1,996 revealing that there were more or less than 201 establishments that had been closed down within the period 2000–2006. There were even more establishments in 1995 with a total of 1,877 in all. The trend shows that from 1995 to 2000, there was a growth of 2.94%, but from 2000 to 2006 a decreasing growth rate of -1.75% was registered. Just like the past years, for the year 2006, commercial activities within the city are classified into wholesale, retail and service-oriented businesses.

The industrial sector of the municipal economy comprises 210 establishments in year 2006 as compared with 207 in 2000. This reflects a 2.4% increase in industrial activities over a period of six years (2000–2006). The existing industries are mostly on a micro scale except for the Coca-Cola Bottlers Philippines, Inc. located in barangay Guinatan which is the only significant employment generator within the locality at that time. Following the previous year's trend, industries currently operating are agro-industries, wood-based manufacturing or service-oriented industries.

The commercial area includes areas which are occupied by public markets, wholesale and retail stores, restaurants, banks, shops and other establishments or structures engaged in commercial activities. The bulk of those who are engaged in trade and commerce are found in the public markets. The area covered by the commercial area is approximately 90.56 hectares or 2.62% of the urban core.

As compared to the 2000 existing commercial area of 17 hectares, the increase of 73.56 hectares in 2007 is an indication that Ilagan is racing towards commercialization.

The transformation of Ilagan into a fast growing city in Cagayan Valley became evident upon the assumption in office of then Mayor Josemarie L. Diaz, the re-structuring of the economic landscape of the city and the eventual transformation of its business climate into a business friendly environment successfully lured multi-national companies in investing their capitals into its market. Economic boom began to ingulf Ilagan with the entry of eight banks and financial institutions in just a number of months.

The Local Government of Ilagan responded positively with these developments by the enactment of legislative measures including the provision of the Investment Incentive Code which provided for tax incentives to investments. These measures eventually opened the flood gates for big investments to enter the local market that included the establishments of malls like the Northstar Mall (now called Xentro Mall) and  Talavera Square Mall that house the Savemore, Robinsons Supermarket, Puregold, Jollibee, McDonald's, Red Ribbon, Goldilocks, Mang Inasal, Greenwich, Chowking and many other stores.

At present, Ilagan has one of the fastest-growing economy in the province of Isabela as well as in the whole Cagayan Valley over the past years. The city is the primary growth center and investment hub of the Cagayan Valley region due to the rapid commercialization and stabilization of the different sectors involved in its economy. It has two major public markets which is the old Pamilihang Bayan ng Ilagan located in Centro Poblacion (now called Xentro Market) and the multi-million pesos New Ilagan Public Market Complex in barangay Baligatan. In front of the public market is a three-storey structure called as Ilagan City Mall, the first LGU-owned and operated mall in the city. The increasing number of market goers coming from the different regions of the city and adjacent municipalities, prompted city officials to facilitate the construction of the modern market. As of 31 December 2021, Ilagan has a total of 21 banks with a total volume of bank deposits at Php 15.7 billion. There are also thousands of commercial establishments composed of distributors, retail and wholesale. Pawnshops, lending companies, insurance agencies, cooperatives and other financial institutions are spread all over the city.

Food and beverage
There are several food and beverage companies in the city. The largest of which is the Coca-Cola Beverages Philippines, Inc. (CCBPI) which operates a softdrink bottling plant in barangay Guinatan. Another, is a vinegar and soy sauce fermentation company locally known as 'Best Choice', which is operated and owned by Robelly's Food Products and also the Jack Confectionery, which operates a wine fermentation plant. There are 15 bakeries/bakeshops and 1 ice cream/ice drop company. Aside from the increasing number of local cafés, restaurants and several multi-national fastfood companies opened their respective branch/es in the city.

Furniture making
One major industry in Ilagan is furniture making. Several furniture shops, located along the National Highway in barangays Alinguigan 2nd & Alinguigan 3rd, manufacture and sell furnitures made of quality narra wood. These barangays were dubbed as "Butaka City" of Ilagan, where the Guinness Book of Records' entry for the biggest lounge chair in the world, the Butaka, was manufactured.

Tobacco industry
Ilagan became one of the largest producers of tobacco during the Spanish time. The tobacco monopoly have caused the valley to languish in poverty from 1785 to 1797. The lifting of the monopoly was caused by the heavy loss incurred by the government. A royal decree released in 1882 which aimed to totally abolished the monopoly and attracted foreign capitalist to invest in the country. In Ilagan, the Compañía General de Tabacos de Filipinas also known as La Tabacalera was established in 1881 and produced the famous La Flor de la Isabela which was the largest company of its kind in the world at that time. The Tabacalera acquired two haciendas in Ilagan which were Hacienda San Antonio and Hacienda Santa Isabel. The majority of the western barangays of the city are planting tobacco other than rice, corn and high-value crops. The National Tobacco Administration is the attached agency under the Department of Agriculture that is mandated to conduct series of efficacy trials, scientific experiments and tests on new agricultural products, inputs, systems and processes being introduced. They recommend and certify for the applicability and efficacy on the recommended tobacco technologies. Its provincial field office is located at Barangay Osmeña.

Agri-support activities
Most of the industries in the city are agri-based. For the last ten years, there has been a great number of local investment in poultry and hog raising. There are seven poultry contract growers and 33 small and medium scale hog raisers in Ilagan. Other support facilities, warehouses and small rice mills, strategically located in different barangays of Ilagan address the storage needs of farmers during the harvest season.

The Department of Agriculture Regional Field Office 2 (DA-RFO2) and the city government of Ilagan had agreed to establish an I-Corn Complex worth P196.7 million. The agreement was reached after a consultation meeting led by the DA Region 2 officials and representatives from other concerned government agencies. The Department of Agriculture will provide P107 million while the city government of Ilagan will provide P89.7 million for the said complex that will serve as a one-stop agri-commercial center once completed. The I-Corn Complex will serve Ilagueño corn farmers including those from Isabela and the rest of Cagayan Valley. The establishment of the facility is also aimed to solve problems in corn production, particularly on drying during the wet season. The construction of the corn complex is in support to the Agriculture and Fisheries Modernization Act (AFMA), which aims to strengthen the agri-fisheries sector in a modernized perspective to attain food security, poverty alleviation, income enhancement and profitability, global competitiveness and sustainability. The complex is designed to be used as a post-harvest, processing and research facility that will ensure product quality and thus boost the income of farmers. It is expected to be operational by February 2024 with the operation of the Corn Innovation Center whose construction and implementation started in January 2023. The mechanical drying facility as one of its components will help farmers cope with losses and damage during calamities. The said corn complex facility is located at Barangay Marana 1st, where the city government donated the lot for the construction.

Jeep and tricycle body building
There are nine motor vehicle assembly shops in Ilagan; five jeepney assembly shops and four tricycle side-car makers. These motor vehicle assembly shops respond to the increasing need for transportation service in the city.

Tourism industry
The city has best tourism sceneries for local and foreign tourists. These includes natural attractions like Ilagan Sanctuary where you can find limestone caves and the Pinzal falls, Abuan river and Burmurbur falls. Man-made attractions include Ilagan Japanese Tunnel, Isabela Museum and Library, the Queen Isabela II monument (Skypark) and Butaka Shrine (commonly known as Bonifacio Park) where it features the largest wooden lounge chair in the world. 

Ilagan Sanctuary is a 200-hectare protected area located within the 819-hectare Fuyot Springs National Park along the foothills of the Sierra Madre mountain range in barangay Santa Victoria, fifteen kilometers away from the city proper. Attractions inside the park include prayer mountain, bird viewing, Butterfly park, animal kingdom (mini zoo), natural spring pool, boating & kayaking, wall-climbing & rappelling, cable car & tree-top adventure, 350-meter long & 700-meter high zipline, 1.5 kilometer hike to Pinzal falls and the 400-meter limestone caves. Some activities in the sanctuary will require you to ride on an all terrain vehicle (ATV). 

The Ilagan Japanese Tunnel in barangay Santo Tomas is a war tunnel headquarter military base of the Japanese during the World War II and is about 40 meters by 3.66 meters wide but has yet to be fully scaled and explored. 

Abuan River is part of the Northern Sierra Madre Natural Park. It has an average elevation of 82 meters above sea level. It serves as the main river in the Northern Sierra Madre park that feeds the Abuan watershed in the city. Tourists and visitors can explore the diverse animal and plant life in one of the country’s remaining and lush virgin forest.

Culture
Ilagan today, acknowledged as the corn capital of the country lives its economic boom while playing a vital contributory role for the province of Isabela as its capital since its creation as a province. To the predominantly agricultural economy of the province of Isabela, the city adds the vigor of its trade, commercial and cultural life.

Aggaw na Ilagan
Aggaw na Ilagan or Ilagan Day is celebrated annually every May 4. It was the date when Ilagan was founded as a town.

Balai na Ilagan
Balai na Ilagan has been set up to give a communal space of Ilagueños with the aim to nurture artistic talents of residents and to provide a multipurpose hall within the diocese of the Roman Catholic Church. Balai na Ilagan is intended to celebrate arts and culture in the province of Isabela.

Binallay
A native rice cake prepared year-round in Ilagan. It was during the administration of then Mayor Albano that Binallay Festival became the official festivity of Ilagan but was later replaced by the Mammangui Festival.

Cityhood anniversary
Celebrated every August 11. The city government celebrated the first anniversary of Ilagan's cityhood charter in 2013. On August 11, 2015, marked another day in the history of Ilagan as the Department of Agriculture proclaimed the city as the new Corn Capital of the Philippines during its third cityhood anniversary.

Mammangi festival
Celebrated during the last week of May; Mammangi is an Ibanag word meaning the harvest or planting of corn. It honors the farmers who are the real foundation of Ilagan's economy and is celebrated as a thanksgiving activity for a good harvest. In 2011, General Ordinance No. 33 promulgated during the administration of then Mayor Diaz ordained Mammangui Festival as the official festivity of Ilagan to be celebrated on the month of May.

Patronal and town fiesta
As a predominantly Catholic nation, the culture of observing the feast days of the most venerated Roman Catholic icons are common and widespread in the Philippines. In Ilagan, the city celebrates the feast day of its patron, San Fernando, every May 30 including the celebration of the town fiesta.

Sports

Isabela sports complex
In 1993, Ilagan hosted the Palarong Pambansa (National Games) and in 2011 the SCUAA National Olympics. It was held at the Isabela Sports Complex. The sports complex was erected by the National Government and local officials during the presidency of Fidel V. Ramos as a permanent facility for the province of Isabela, in barangay Alibagu, Ilagan, the capital. The impressive facility of 50 hectares, on which has built a stadium with a 39,000 seating capacity, likewise has an athlete's village for housing participants. Some of the houses for the athlete's village were donated by certain civic-minded citizens and organizations who were approached by the officials of the province through the initiative of the late former Isabela Governor Benjamin G. Dy. The complex is also equipped with a basketball court, volleyball courts, swimming pool, badminton and tennis courts, sepak takraw court, oval rubber track and a baseball field.

City of Ilagan sports complex

The City of Ilagan Sports Complex (formerly called as Paguirigan Memorial Athletic Stadium) is a sports facility equipped with new modern rubber track, basketball, volleyball, badminton and tennis courts, concrete bleachers and a new swimming pool that was built to accommodate major sports and athletic events such as the Cagayan Valley Regional Athletic Association (CAVRAA) meet held in 2016 and 2017. It was the chosen venue by the Philippine Athletics Track and Field Association (PATAFA), Inc. for the 2017, 2018 and 2019 Ayala Philippine Athletics Championships, 12th and 14th South East Asia Youth Athletics Championship and the 2017 Philippine National Open Invitational Athletics Championship, where world class athletes from Thailand, Indonesia, Malaysia, Singapore, Vietnam, Cambodia, Timor-Leste, Laos, Brunei, Sri Lanka, Hong Kong, Fil-Am contingent, Philippine Team and the host City of Ilagan team participated in the said event. It is the first city outside Metro Manila to have hosted the championships for 2 years in a row, first and only Philippine city in this decade to have an International Association of Athletics Federations (IAAF) certified track and field competition venue, first host city to stage the international format of athletics competition and the first host city to have organized the championships integrating entertainment and the thrill of sports competition.

On January 11, 2019, the Philippine Sports Commission (PSC) announced that Ilagan will be hosting the 2019 Batang Pinoy Luzon qualifying leg sports competition; it was held on March 16–23, 2019. Batang Pinoy is a national competition for athletes under fifteen years old and was established through Executive Order No. 44, which was signed by then President Joseph Estrada on December 2, 1998.

City of Ilagan community center
The City of Ilagan Community Center is a government facility that was built to accommodate indoor events such as basketball games, badminton and volleyball tournaments, cheerdance competitions, concerts, and other important activities. The community center is now fully airconditioned. The SK Federation in Ilagan has a yearly basketball tournament for the youth of the city. The facility is being used for meeting and serving as a vaccination site.

Ping-Pong central
Table tennis is also a popular sport in the city. It is played regularly in Ping-Pong Central in Francisca Village, Baligatan and hosted by the Table Tennis Association of Ilagan (TATAC-Ilagan). Regular ranking tournament is held monthly among residents of Ilagan. Open tournament is held annually.

Isabela golf club
The only golf course in Isabela is located in Ilagan. This golf course has produced several World Junior Golf Champions.

Government

Local government

The city is governed by a city mayor designated as its local chief executive and by a city council as its legislative body in accordance with the Local Government Code. The mayor, vice mayor, and the councilors are elected directly by the people through an election which is being held every three years.

As a component city and the capital of the Province of Isabela, government officials in the provincial level are voted by the electorates of the city. The provincial government have political jurisdiction over local transactions of the city government.

City seal

The city seal has an inscription of the city name "City of Ilagan" and the name of province "Isabela" with years 1686 as the foundation of the town and 2012 as the year of its cityhood declaration. Another inscription which is written in Latin words Vox populi, Vox Dei which is in literal meaning "the voice of the people, the voice of God". The mountain represents the Sierra Madre mountain ranges, the longest mountain ranges in the Philippines. The rivers which represent the Cayagan river and Ilagan river. The Ilagan river that flows westward from Sierra Madre, joining the Cagayan river. The buildings which represent the urbanization of the city with the municipal logo. The corn represents the city as the corn capital of the Philippines which is one of the major agricultural products of the city.

Elected officials

There were 28 municipal mayors during its municipal period since 1904. The first municipal mayor was Rafael Maramag who served the town from 1904 to 1906. Its first city mayor is Josemarie L. Diaz, DMD from 2012 to 2016.

Congress representation

Ilagan, as a component city and provincial capital, belongs to the first legislative district of the province of Isabela. Currently, the city is represented by Antonio T. Albano in the house of representatives.

Infrastructure

Transportation
Ilagan is linked by a national highway called Maharlika Highway (designated as Asian Highway 26, AH26 by Asian Highway Network). Ilagan's longest bridge is the Malalam Bridge in barangay Malalam going north, which was inaugurated on December 8, 1995.

Ilagan is the only place in the Cagayan Valley Region that considers jeepneys as one of the primary means of public transportation within its vicinity and neighboring municipalities. There are 432 Jeepneys used as the major public transportation in Ilagan with corresponding routes from Centro-Calamagui-Alibagu-Upi junction-Guibang vice versa, Centro-Calamagui-Bliss Village-Salindingan vice versa, Centro-San Antonio region vice versa, Centro-Bintacan vice versa, and neighboring towns Ilagan-Gamu-Burgos-Roxas vice versa, plus 4,000 tricycle units and few bus companies. Each company operates a fleet of air conditioned buses with daily trips to Manila from their respective terminals. Several bus companies also use the Ilagan route from Tuguegarao City and Northern Isabela to Manila, Dagupan, Baguio and other destinations.

Victory Liner and GV Florida Transport have terminals within the city that offers daily trips to Kamias, Quezon City and Sampaloc, Manila. The Local Government Unit (LGU) inaugurated the Ilagan City Central Transport Terminal beside the Northstar Mall in Alibagu on November 28, 2011.

The city will soon adapt the Hybrid Electric Road Train (HERT) which was developed by the DOST as an alternative mode of transport for front-liners, community outreach activities, among others. Each coach of the HERT can accommodate 220 passengers.

On May 4, 2022, the city government launched eleven units of taxis as LTFRB issued 90-day provisional authority. The transport service will ply across Cagayan Valley and it is the first in the region. Additionally, the city launched 58 public utility vehicles that will service the city as part of its modernization program.

Bridges
Baculud Overflow Bridge. In 2014, the city government inaugurated the Baculud Overflow Bridge that connects the poblacion area to the northeastern barangays going to Tuguegarao. 
In 2016, the structure was damaged by flood brought by the torrential rain when Typhoon Haima or locally known as Super Typhoon Lawin struck the provinces of Isabela and Cagayan. The authorities had to close the bridge until the completion of its rehabilition which began in 2017. On May 4, 2019, the two lane overflow bridge was reinaugurated by the city government during the 333rd founding anniversary of Ilagan.
Lullutan Bridge. In February 2015, the Lullutan Bridge was opened to the public local by the national and local government. On April 8, 2015, then President Benigno S. Aquino traveled to Isabela to lead the inauguration of the new bridge, which connects the east and west banks of the Cagayan River. It connects the city's western barangays and nearby municipalities of Delfin Albano and Tumauini with the city. Before the construction of the new bridge, residents have to use barges to transport agricultural products to the market. Due to this. travel time between barangays on either side of the river has been cut short drastically.
The bridge in Santa Maria (Cabisera 8) was completed and opened to the public in 2015. Road concreting and widening, creation of diversion and circumferential roads and farm to market roads were prioritized by the national and city government to help mobilize the transportation goods and delivery of basic services within the city's jurisdiction and neighboring municipalities.

Malalam Bridge. The bridge connects barangay Malalam to Alinguigan 2nd going to Tuguegarao.

Road Networks
National Road.
 
Provincial Road. Ilagan is accessible by all means of land transportation. From the Poblacion to the 91 barangays and five adjacent municipalities. Regular jeepney trips are from 6:00 am to 9:00 pm. Tricycles are available 24 hours a day.
Ilagan-Divilacan Road. The construction of an 82-kilometer Ilagan-Divilacan Road through the protected Sierra Madre mountains is on-going to open access to the coastal towns of Divilacan, Palanan and Maconacon. The approved budget contract of the project amounting to P1.5B, will pass through the foothills of the 359,486-hectare Northern Sierra Madre mountain ranges and will take four years to complete. The project will improve an old logging road used by the defunct Acme Logging Corp.

Telecommunications
The city has a number of internet cafés, and the majority of the country's Internet Service provider (ISP e available in Ilagan sucis,expected to be completed Globe Broadband, Converge Fiber, PLDT Fiber and Digitel. Cable TV provider Polaris Cable Vision also offers fiber Internet connection.

The Philippine Long Distance Telephone Company provides fixed line services. Wireless mobile communications services are provided by Smart Communications and Globe Telecommunications. Dito Telecommunity is now available offering connectivity service.
Postal and courier services. The Philippine Postal Corporation (PhilPOst) is the major postal service provider in Ilagan. Express delivery services are provided by LBC, FedEx (Air21),JRS Express, and EMS (through PhilPost).
Other companies providing various telecommunications services such as telegraph and fax services are PT&T, and RCPI now Universal Storefront Services Corporation.

Power

Isabela Electric Cooperative II, Inc. (ISELCO II). Residences and establishments are able to get their energy needs through the service provided by the Isabela Electric Cooperative II, Inc. (ISELCO II). Its main office is located at barangay Alibagu. Based on MPDO record, 63 out of 91 barangays are energized. As of 2011, Ilagan is now 100% energized. Also, a sub-station of National Grid Corporation of the Philippines (NGCP) is located in barangay Baligatan.
Freeway Lighting System. Ilagan is one of the few places in the Cagayan Valley Region that has a continuous freeway lighting system. The city government have managed to install incandescent highway lights along the national road from barangay Alibagu in the south all the way to barangay San Juan in the north.
Solar Power Plant. The Department of Energy (DOE) has approved on May 27, 2015, the service contract of the largest solar PV power plant in the Philippines. Cheap solar energy will be available for residents here soon after the proponents of the P7-billion solar power plant have already secured its funding. A twenty-five (25) year Service contract was signed between Living Project 4 People Philippines Inc. (LP4PP) and the Department of Energy. The signing will start the process of completion of development, installation, construction, commissioning and operation of a 100.0 MW Solar PV Project in the city. LP4PP said that the solar project will be constructed in 10 phases to install 10.0 MW for each phase that will start construction in August 2015. Accordingly, it is a pure solar PV Grid connected installation that will avail on the privileges under the Renewable Energy Law of the country. The renewable energy to be generated will be sold directly to the National Grid Corporation of the Philippines (NGCP) under the Feed-in-Tariff Scheme of the RE law. The 100.0 MW Solar PV project will help alleviate the current electricity shortage in the country that causes regular black-outs resulting in industry closures as well as inconvenience to the consumers. The solar power facility will be constructed at a 100-hectare land at barangay Cabannungan, several kilometers away from the city proper. 

 In December 2022, the Department of Energy (DOE) has given the go signal to a Filipino-French joint venture to develop one of the biggest renewable energy projects in the Philippines - an P18-billion solar farm in Ilagan City. The project will be undertaken by San Ignacio Energy Resources Development Corporation, which is part of the Nextnorth Energy Group developing over 450 megawatts of solar and hydro projects in Northern Luzon, and French firm Total Eren S.A. The project will involve the development of a 440 MWp/336 MWac solar PV project to be built on around 400 hectares of available land located along the Northern Luzon high voltage transmission network of the National Grid Corporation of the Philippines (NGCP). The project is scheduled to start construction in 2024 and start feeding electricity into the grid in 2025.

Water and sewerage system

City of Ilagan Water District (CIWD). It is a government-owned and controlled corporation that is mandated to supply all the water needs of its concessionaires. It has managed to put up several pumping stations all throughout the city to cater the increasing demand of Ilagan's growing population and economy. Some residents and privately owned business entities have their own electric water pumps and some are able to put up their own traditional deep wells for their own water needs and irrigation systems specially those residents from far-flung barangays who are not able to avail the service provided by the water district. Its main office is located in barangay Osmeña. Several water refilling stations have opened to serve as an alternative for the residents for their water needs. Also, the city government is continuously implementing solutions in line with the water and sewerage problems of the city such as the construction of deep wells in every barangay and the construction of drainages and canals in those area affected by floods during the rainy and stormy season.

Pasa Small Reservoir Irrigation Project (PSRIP). The irrigation project is a $21.7 million government project in barangay Pasa, a joint undertaking between the South Korean government, through Korea International Cooperation Agency (Koica), and the Philippines, through the National Irrigation Administration and the local government of Isabela. The project entailed construction of a 34-meter high earth-filled dam across Pasa River, a reservoir with an active storage of 3.90 million cubic meters, with 5.93 kilometers of a main canal and 16.20 kilometers of lateral canals. According to authorities and government officials, the project is said to be under South Korea's five-year program under the East Asia Climate Change Partnership to address climate change and to bolster Green Growth in Asia. It was built to help mitigate floods with its small water impounding or catchment basin features aside from irrigating more farmlands in the province, the project is also aimed at reducing the impact of climate change and promoting water management in rural areas. The dam is expected to irrigate eight hundred (800) hectares of farmlands, covering the barangays of Pasa, Santa Victoria, Fuyo, Morado and Minabang, all within Ilagan City, and should benefit seven hundred forty seven (747) families in the province of Isabela. Also, the authorities added that the Pasa Dam project would further fortify Isabela as the country's leading agriculture province, which has kept the title as a top corn producer and second in rice production.

Healthcare

In 2014, the City Government inaugurated a diagnostic center in San Antonio City Hospital.

 Completed in 2014, the Department of Health – Drug Abuse Treatment and Rehabilitation Center Region II (DOH-DATRC RO2) was founded to bring hopes and changes to the victims of drug dependency and to provide affordable, quality and sustainable rehabilitative programs and services in partnership with other agencies towards the realization of its goal and for the fulfilment of its mandate. It is the first and only government owned treatment and rehabilitation center in Cagayan Valley located at Barangay Centro San Antonio, with a total land area of 1.97 hectares. Upon accreditation of 50-bed capacity on 12 March 2017 and completion of some infrastructures, the facility was allowed to accommodate clients for residential program. On 12 April 2017 the center had its first residential admission and two months after, the facility was inaugurated with the presence of former DOH Secretary Pauline Jean Ubial.

On 25 November 2020, the city government inaugurated its own Molecular Laboratory at San Antonio City of Ilagan Hospital. It is the first LGU-owned and operated health facility of its kind in Cagayan Valley. The Department of Health (DOH) gave its license to operate and accommodate patients of COVID-19.
 
On 11 August 2021, the city government inaugurated the City of Ilagan Medical Center located in barangay Lullutan as one of the highlights during its 9th cityhood anniversary celebration. The hospital has a 100-bed capacity and is now being used as an isolation facility for COVID-19 patients.

Health centers
City Health Office I (San Vicente)
City Health Office II (Marana 1st)
City of Ilagan Physical Medicine and Rehabilitation Center

Public hospitals
City of Ilagan Medical Center
Gov. Faustino N. Dy, Sr. Memorial Hospital 
San Antonio City of Ilagan Hospital

Private hospitals
Isabela Doctors General Hospital
Dr. Victor S. Villaroman Memorial Hospital

Overall, the city has three public and two private hospitals and three City Health Units. There are also dozens of dental clinics, maternity and pediatric clinics, derma clinics and pharmacies scattered around the city. As of 2022, Citimed of Ilagan is still under construction.

Education
Ilagan is the center of education in the province of Isabela especially for neighboring municipalities of Tumauini, Gamu, Burgos, Roxas, Quirino, Naguilian, Benito Soliven, San Mariano and Delfin Albano. Provincial field offices of the different government agencies like the Technical Education and Skills Development Authority (TESDA) and Department of Education (DepEd) are all located in the city. The DepEd office located at the Government Center in barangay Alibagu governs school districts in the entire province of Isabela except for Cauayan, Ilagan and Santiago cities.

Elementary and secondary schools

The Schools Division of the City of Ilagan governs the city's public education system. The division office is a field office of the DepEd in Cagayan Valley region. The office governs the public and private elementary and public and private high schools throughout the city.

There are six integrated high schools, ten secondary public schools and three other private secondary schools. There are 88 elementary schools throughout Ilagan, while the most populated are located in the poblacion area.

Ilagan has formerly three districts namely: Ilagan East District, Ilagan West District and Ilagan South District when it was under the Division of Isabela, the mother school division. These districts has clusters of schools geographically located.

On January 21, 2013, the Schools Division of the City of Ilagan was created following the success of its cityhood bid in 2012. Denizon Domingo was installed as the first city school division superintendent.

On June 17, 2013, the new school division reorganized the three existing school districts: Ilagan East District, Ilagan West District and Ilagan South District to established additional three school districts: Ilagan North District, Ilagan Northwest District and San Antonio District. There are now six school districts in the city.
Ilagan East District
Ilagan North District
Ilagan Northwest District
Ilagan West District
Ilagan South District
San Antonio District

On July 8, 2019, the Local School Board was reorganized through executive order of the City Mayor. Currently, the schools division is headed by Gilbert Tong.

Technical schools
There are also technical schools in the city which is being governed by Technical Education and Skills Development Authority (TESDA). These institutions offer short, one or two year courses.
Chronicles Institute of Isabela
Colegio de Ilagan
Isabela Provincial Training Center
Isabela School of Arts and Trades (ISAT)
Isabela State University also offers two year courses
Far East Computer Technology - Ilagan
Saint Ferdinand College also offers TESDA courses

Higher educational institutions
Ilagan also has two higher educational instructions which are accredited by CHED. They offer undergraduate and graduate programs to the public. The local government also supports scholarship grants to deserving students for college degree programs.
Isabela State University
Saint Ferdinand College

Training facility
A memorandum of agreement was signed between PNP and Ilagan City government for the establishment of PNP Training Facility located in barangay Sta. Barbara.

Media
Ilagan's main media outlet is the radio.

The following may not be in operation as of 2022.

Radio
711 kHz DZYI under Swara Sug Broadcasting Corporation / SonShine Radyo
900 kHz DZSE 900 Radyo Alerto Asean - AM Ilagan
101.7 MHz under Pacific Broadcasting Service

Television
The following Television stations are present:
Channel 4 - People’s Television Network
Channel 7 - GMA Network, Inc.
Channel 41 - Interactive Broadcast Media, Inc.

Print
New Valley Times Press
Squiggy Printing Services

Notable personalities

Politics
Silvestre Bello III - secretary of the Department of Labor and Employment.

Religion
Miguel Purugganan - Roman Catholic Bishop of the Roman Catholic Diocese of Ilagan honored at the Philippines' Bantayog ng mga Bayani for fighting against the Human rights abuses of the Marcos dictatorship.

Sports
Ricci Rivero - a basketball player of the UAAP, actor and TV host.
Hezy Val B. Acuña II - is a Filipino professional basketball player for the MJAS Zenith–Talisay Aquastars of the Pilipinas VisMin Super Cup.
Jackson Corpuz - is a Filipino professional basketball player for Magnolia Hotshots of Philippine Basketball Association.

See also
Ilagan Cathedral
Ilagan Japanese War Tunnel
Ilagan River
Ilagan Sanctuary
Ilagan Sports Complex

References

External links

Government
Official Website of City of Ilagan, The Corn Capital of the Philippines
Isabela Government Website
Economic Profile of the City of Ilagan
[ Philippine Standard Geographic Code]
Ilagan Profile - Cities and Municipalities Competitive Index (dti.gov.ph)

General information
City Profile at the National Competitiveness Council of the Philippines 
Local Governance Performance Management System
Philippine Census Information
The Road to Cityhood
Speech of President Aquino at the inauguration of the Lullutan Bridge
Philippines’ Largest Solar Power Plant to Rise in Ilagan City, Isabela
P7-B solar power plant to rise in Isabela

Social media
MyCity Ilagan on Facebook

 
1686 establishments in the Philippines
Cities in Isabela (province)
Component cities in the Philippines
Provincial capitals of the Philippines
Populated places established in 1686
Populated places on the Rio Grande de Cagayan